The Wizard of Oz is an illustrated interactive fiction game developed by and published by Windham Classics for the Apple II, Commodore 64, MS-DOS and MSX in 1985. It is an adaptation of the books The Wonderful Wizard of Oz and The Marvelous Land of Oz.

Gameplay

Plot

Reception

The Wizard of Oz was positively received by press, including II Computing, Ahoy!, and Commodore Power Play.

References

External links
The Wizard of Oz at MobyGames

1980s interactive fiction
Interactive fiction based on works
1985 video games
Apple II games
Commodore 64 games
DOS games
MSX games
Single-player video games
Video games developed in the United States
Video games featuring female protagonists
Video games based on Oz (franchise)
Video games about witchcraft